may refer to:

 Atago Shrine (Kyoto)
 Atago Shrine (Tokyo)